Kim Hamilton (born Dorothy Mae Aiken; September 12, 1932 – September 16, 2013) was an American film and television actress, as well as a director, writer, and artist.  Her career spanned more than half a century, from the early 1950s to 2010. Hamilton's early film credits included the 1959 film noir Odds Against Tomorrow opposite Harry Belafonte and The Leech Woman in 1960. She was also one of the first African-American actors to appear on the soap opera Days of Our Lives and was the only African-American to appear in a speaking role on Leave It to Beaver.

Hamilton portrayed, in an uncredited role, Helen Robinson in the 1962 film adaptation of To Kill a Mockingbird, based on Harper Lee's novel of the same name. She was the film's last surviving African-American adult cast member with a speaking role.

Early life and career

Born in Los Angeles, California, Hamilton as a young woman initially wanted to be a model but said she could not find work in the fashion industry owing to her short stature and race. Instead, she enrolled in acting classes after seeing an advertisement in the Los Angeles Times and then enlisted the services of an agent. Hamilton made her professional acting debut in the 1950s television sitcom Amos 'n' Andy. She played the girlfriend of Andy (Spencer Williams) on the show for several episodes.

She briefly moved to London to pursue acting. Hamilton was able to find some roles but returned to the United States after the British Actors' Equity Association and the Secretary of State for Employment denied her a work permit, a practice commonly used against American actors at the time.

Hamilton appeared in more than 60 television series and television films throughout her career. In 1960, she guest-starred in an episode of The Twilight Zone called "The Big Tall Wish." In 1963 and 1964, she played a high-school librarian on two episodes of the popular series My Three Sons. She also became one of the first black actresses to appear on the soap opera Days of Our Lives. Other guest appearances included on the Adam-12 episode entitled "Hollywood Division (01/22/1974), and in the series The Thin Man, General Hospital, Sanford and Son, Good Times, The Jeffersons, In the Heat of the Night, All In The Family, and Law & Order. She portrayed Songi in "Final Mission" a 1990 episode of Star Trek: The Next Generation. Her last television credit was a 2008 episode of the ABC series Private Practice.

Hamilton was also an artist, director, and writer. In her final credits, she was credited as Kim Rousseau.

In December 2007, Hamilton was honored for her career achievements by Columbia University and the Harlem community at an event held at the Museum of the City of New York. Hamilton's honor was part of series of Columbia University's Big Read program, focusing on To Kill a Mockingbird through guest lectures, productions, and panel discussions.

Personal life and death
Kim Hamilton was married twice.  Her first marriage, at age 18, was to Robert Henry Hamilton in 1951.  They had two children but divorced a decade later.  One of her children, her son Robert, predeceased her. She then dated German-born actor Werner Klemperer for more than two decades before they married in 1997. They remained together until Klemperer's death on December 6, 2000.

Hamilton in her later years divided her time between the East and West coasts, living at her home in Manhattan and at her other residence in her hometown of Los Angeles.  In 2013, four days after her 81st birthday, she died of undisclosed causes while in Los Angeles.

Filmography

Films

Television

References

External links

1932 births
2013 deaths
American expatriates in England
Actresses from Los Angeles
African-American actresses
American television actresses
American film actresses
20th-century African-American people
21st-century African-American people
20th-century African-American women
21st-century African-American women